The Latvian Social Democratic Workers' Party (LSDSP) is a social-democratic political party in Latvia and the second oldest existing Latvian political party after the Latvian Farmers' Union. It is not currently represented in the parliament of Latvia. The party tends to hold a less Russophilic view than fellow social-democratic party "Harmony".

History

Founding, interwar Latvia, under authoritarianism and occupation 
The Latvian Social Democratic Workers' Party was founded on 17 June 1918, by Menshevik elements who had been expelled from the Social Democracy of the Latvian Territory in 1915. Once Latvia became independent, LSDSP was one of the two most influential political parties (along with the Latvian Farmers' Union). LSDSP held 57 out of 150 seats in the 1920 Constitutional Assembly (Satversmes Sapulce). It won the most seats in each of four parliamentary elections of that period (31 out of 100 in 1922, 33 in 1925, 26 in 1928 and 21 in 1931). The leader of the LSDSP, Pauls Kalniņš, was speaker of the Latvian parliament from 1925 to 1934.

The party itself, however, would often be in opposition because of many smaller right-wing parties forming coalition governments, typically led by the Latvian Farmers' Union.

The party was a member of the Labour and Socialist International between 1923 and 1940, and was admitted into the modern Socialist International in 1994.

The LSDSP was banned after the 1934 coup by Kārlis Ulmanis, together with all other political parties, and remained banned after the Soviet annexation in 1940. When many Latvians left Latvia during World War II, the LSDSP was restored as an "exile organization", operating in Sweden in 1945, and later in other Western countries.

Return to Latvia, activities 1990–2010 
When Latvia became independent again in 1991, the LSDSP returned to Latvia. In the early 1990s, it struggled with internal splits. At one point, Latvia had three social democratic parties, two of them being descendants of the LSDSP, and the third being the reformed faction of the former Communist Party of Latvia (LSDP). Eventually, all three parties merged, under the name of the LSDSP.

The merged party enjoyed some success in the parliamentary election of 1998, winning 14 seats out of 100; and in local elections in 2001, when one of its members, Gundars Bojārs, became the mayor of Riga. It was less successful in the next legislative election, held on 5 October 2002, where it got only 4% of the vote, and did not make the 5% minimum to get seats. The decline of the LSDSP's popularity continued as the party lost the mayor's seat in Riga in the 2005 municipal election (keeping 7 seats in the Riga City Council but forced into the opposition). The parliamentary election of 2006 brought even more dissatisfying results for the LSDSP, as the party got 3.5% of votes and thus got no representation in the parliament once again.

2010–present 
For the 2010 parliamentary election, the LSDSP formed the Responsibility Alliance with smaller parties, but their performance was disatrous, receiving less than 1% of the vote. In January 2011, who was supported by the outgoing leader , was elected as party chairman. He defeated Ansis Dobelis, who was more aligned with youth activist circles and later formed The Progressives. His tenure did not improve the party's performance, with the LSDSP not running in the 2014 parliamentary election. By 2017, Dinēvičs had returned to lead the party. At the 2018 election, the party received just 0,21% of the vote.

2022 brought a historic turn for the party, when on June 1st it joined the Union of Greens and Farmers (ZZS) after the Latvian Green Party had left the alliance, as the second member of ZZS is the Farmer's Union, LSDSP's main rival in the 1920s and 1930s.

In 2012, the Socialist International demoted LSDSP to observer member for not paying membership fees. The party was officially delisted from the Socialist International in December 2014. It currently maintains the status of observer member in the Party of European Socialists.

Election results

Legislative elections

Symbols and logos

See also
Brūno Kalniņš

References

External links
Official website 

Political parties in Latvia
Former member parties of the Socialist International
Political parties of the Russian Revolution
Social democratic parties in Latvia
Members of the Labour and Socialist International
Party of European Socialists member parties
Political parties established in 1918
Formerly banned socialist parties